Orehovica is a settlement in the Municipality of Zagorje ob Savi in central Slovenia. It lies on the main road from Izlake to Trojane. The area is part of the traditional region of Upper Carniola. It is now included with the rest of the municipality in the Central Sava Statistical Region.

References

External links

Orehovica on Geopedia

Populated places in the Municipality of Zagorje ob Savi